Qaleh Jiq may refer to:
 Qaleh Jiq, East Azerbaijan
 Qaleh Jiq, Malekan, East Azerbaijan Province
 Qaleh Jiq, Golestan
 Qaleh Jiq-e Bozorg, Golestan Province
 Qaleh Jiq-e Kuchek, Golestan Province

See also
 Qaleh Juq (disambiguation)